Apispiralia is a genus of sea snails, marine gastropod mollusks in the family Mangeliidae.

Species
Species within the genus Apispiralia include:
 Apispiralia albocincta (Angas, 1871)
 Apispiralia catena Laseron, 1954
 Apispiralia maxima Laseron, 1954

References

External links
 Bouchet, P.; Kantor, Y. I.; Sysoev, A.; Puillandre, N. (2011). A new operational classification of the Conoidea. Journal of Molluscan Studies. 77, 273-308
  Tucker, J.K. 2004 Catalog of recent and fossil turrids (Mollusca: Gastropoda). Zootaxa 682:1-1295.
 Worldwide Mollusk Data base : Mangeliidae

 
Gastropod genera